The Admarid Girl is a 1972 Hong Kong film written and directed by Li Han Hsiang, and starring Patrick Tse Yin, Chen Chen, Lee Kwan and Hon Kong.

References

1972 films
Hong Kong action films
1972 action films
1970s Mandarin-language films
Films directed by Li Han-hsiang
1970s Hong Kong films